Frederick "Fred" Leonard Roffey (born 14 April 1895 – October 1988) was an English rugby union and professional rugby league footballer who played in the 1910s and 1920s.

Background
Frederick Roffey was born in Godstone, Surrey, England, and he died aged 93 in Claro, North Yorkshire, England.

Playing career

International honours
Frederick Roffey won 2 caps for Wales in 1921–1926 while at Wigan and St. Helens.

County honours
Frederick Roffey played left-, i.e. number 11, in Monmouthshire's 14-18 defeat by Glamorgan in the non-County Championship match during the 1926–27 season at Taff Vale Park, Pontypridd on Saturday 30 April 1927.

Championship final appearances
Frederick Roffey played left-, i.e. number 11, in Wigan's 13-2 victory over Oldham in the Championship Final during the 1921–22 season at The Cliff, Broughton on Saturday 6 May 1922.

County Cup Final appearances
Frederick Roffey played  in Wigan's 20-2 victory over Leigh in the 1922–23 Lancashire County Cup Final during the 1922–23 season at The Willows, Salford on Saturday 25 November 1922, and played right-, i.e. number 12, and was captain in St. Helens' 10-2 victory over St Helens Recs in the 1926–27 Lancashire County Cup Final during the 1926–27 season at Wilderspool Stadium, Warrington on Saturday 20 November 1926.

Club career
Frederick Roffey changed rugby football codes from rugby union to rugby league when he transferred from Ebbw Vale RFC to Wigan, he made his début for Wigan in the 18-5 victory over Rochdale Hornets at Central Park, Wigan on Saturday 25 September 1920, he scored his first try for Wigan in the 21-0 victory over Salford at The Willows, Salford on Saturday 20 November 1920, he scored his last try for Wigan in the 63-5 victory over Salford at The Willows, Salford on Saturday 17 January 1925, and he played his last match for Wigan in the 4-13 defeat by Hull Kingston Rovers in the Championship play-off semi-final match at Old Craven Park, Kingston upon Hull on Saturday 18 April 1925, and he transferred from Wigan to St. Helens.

References

External links
Statistics at wigan.rlfans.com
Profile at saints.org.uk

1895 births
1988 deaths
Ebbw Vale RFC players
English people of Welsh descent
English rugby league players
English rugby union players
Footballers who switched code
Monmouthshire rugby league team players
People from Godstone
Rugby league hookers
Rugby league locks
Rugby league players from Surrey
Rugby league props
Rugby league second-rows
Rugby union players from Surrey
St Helens R.F.C. players
Wales national rugby league team players
Wigan Warriors players